University Institute of Technology, The University of Burdwan is a "NAAC A accredited" Tier-II (under TEQIP) University  Department of Engineering & Technology constituent  to The University of Burdwan , located in Burdwan, West Bengal. It is the only Government Engineering Public University located in Burdwan District.

References

External links
 University Institute of Technology

Engineering colleges in West Bengal
Universities and colleges in Purba Bardhaman district
Colleges affiliated to West Bengal University of Technology
Educational institutions established in 1998
1998 establishments in West Bengal